Hans Lischka (born July 26, 1943) is an Austrian computational theoretical chemist specialized on development and application of multireference methods for the study of molecular excited states. He is the main developer of the software package Columbus for ab initio multireference calculations and co-developer of the Newton-X program.

Biography 

Hans Lischka was born in Vienna, in 1943, and studied Chemistry at the University of Vienna, where he earned a Ph.D. in 1969, being supervised by Gerhard Derflinger. He was a postdoc with Werner Kutzelnigg in Karlsruhe in 1972-1973 and got his habilitation in theoretical chemistry in 1976.

In 1980, he was a visiting professor with Isaiah Shavitt at the Ohio State University, where he started the development of a set of codes for multireference calculations in collaboration with Ron Shepard, Frank Brown, and Russel Pitzer. This set of programs later became the Columbus system. Hans Lischka became a professor of Theoretical Chemistry at the University of Vienna also in 1980.

Between 2011 and 2015, Hans Lischka was a research professor at Texas Tech University, Lubbock, Texas. Since November 2015, he is a professor at the School of Pharmaceutical Sciences, Tianjin University, Tianjin, China.

Honors and awards 

1972 Alexander–von-Humboldt fellowship

1980 Sandoz Prize for Chemistry

1980 Max Kade Fellowship

2008 Festschrift in Chemical Physics.

2008 International Symposium on “Electron Correlation and Molecular Dynamics for Excited States and Photochemistry”, International Symposium in honor of Hans Lischka’s 65th birthday, July 4, 2008

Scientific contributions, interests and production 

Hans Lischka has published over 300 scientific papers, which have been cited about 20,000 times, with h-index 69 according to Google Scholar.

Hans Lischka has pioneered on the development and implementation of highly-parallelized MRCI, with analytical energy gradients and analytical nonadiabatic couplings.

These methods were later fundamental for the implementation of the Newton-X program. In 2010, Lischka's group published the first ab initio mapping of the deactivation mechanism of UV-excited canonical nucleobases.

His current research interests include method developments in multireference theory and computational photodynamics. His work is also concerned with applications of computational chemistry to graphene defects, polyradicloid systems, organic photovoltaics, interacting nucleobases, and non-covalent interactions.

Academic management activities 

1992 – 1996 Director of the Institute for Theoretical Chemistry and Radiation Chemistry of University of Vienna

1993 – 1995 Head of the section Vienna, Lower Austria and Burgenland of the Austrian Chemical Society

2000 – 2004 Vice director of the Institute for Theoretical Chemistry and Structural Biology

References

External links 
 University of Vienna
 Tianjin University

1943 births
Living people
Austrian chemists